The 2017 Albany Great Danes football team represented the University at Albany, SUNY in the 2017 NCAA Division I FCS football season. They were led by Greg Gattuso, who was in his fourth season as head coach, and played their home games at Bob Ford Field at Tom & Mary Casey Stadium. The Great Danes played as members of the Colonial Athletic Association for the fifth season. They finished the season 4–7, 2–6 in CAA play to finish in a tie for tenth place.

Schedule

Source:

Game summaries

at Old Dominion

at Morgan State

Monmouth

Villanova

at Elon

at Richmond

Maine

Rhode Island

at Stony Brook

at Delaware

New Hampshire

Source:

Ranking movements

References

Albany
Albany Great Danes football seasons
Albany Great Danes football